John Paget may refer to:

 John Paget (author) (1808–1892), English agriculturist and writer on Hungary
 John Paget (barrister) (1811–1898), English police magistrate and author
 John Paget (Puritan minister) (died 1638), English nonconforming minister, pastor at the English Reformed Church, Amsterdam